Raj Bhavan (translation: Government House) is the official residence of the governor of Manipur. The present structure was completed in 1898 after the old thatched roofed structure was destroyed in the Anglo-Manipuri War of 1891. The present governor of Manipur is Anusuiya Uikey.

See also
  Government Houses of the British Indian Empire
 List of governors of Manipur

References

External links
Official Website

Governors' houses in India
Buildings and structures in Imphal
Houses completed in 1898
1898 establishments in India